USS Helena (SSN-725), a  , was the fourth ship of the United States Navy to be named for Helena, Montana. The contract to build her was awarded to the Electric Boat Division of General Dynamics Corporation in Groton, Connecticut on 19 April 1982 and her keel was laid down on 28 March 1985.  She was launched on 28 June 1986 sponsored by Mrs. Jean Busey, and commissioned on 11 July 1987.

References

External links 
Official website
 
Commanding Office Change

Ships built in Groton, Connecticut
Los Angeles-class submarines
Cold War submarines of the United States
Nuclear submarines of the United States Navy
1986 ships
Submarines of the United States